CEVRO is a think-tank affiliated with the Civic Democratic Party (ODS), a political party in the Czech Republic. It was established in 1999 by Ivan Langer.

According to Ivan Langer, the main goal of CEVRO is to improve political culture, education in social sciences and support of democracy and freedom around the world.

CEVRO Institute

On September 15th, 2005, CEVRO established its own private university, the CEVRO Institute, providing social science education at BA and MA levels and several professional post-graduate programs. It is focused on education and research in the area of social sciences and public policy. Educational programmes include political science, international relations, law, economics, and public administration.

Management
Management Board
Ivan Langer, Chairman
Jiří Frgal
Ladislav Mrklas
Jan Zahradil
Supervisory Board
Oldřich Vlasák, Chairman
Roman Brncal
Jaroslav Salivar
Executive Team
Director: Jiří Kozák
Project Manager: Anežka Fuchsová
Project Manager - Coordinator of the Liberal-Conservative Academy: Lucie Buchtíková
Coordinator of the Liberal-Conservative Academy: Daniel Bielczyk
Political Marketing Coordinator: Marek Buchta
Project Manager: Lukáš Rieger
Project Manager: Petra Jišová
Project Egypt: Mohamed Saad

Activities

Political education
The academy's political education activities consist of three programmes:

 education of ODS members, with an aim of improving the expertise, good governance and communication preparedness within the party.
 Women and Politics, a programme aimed at increasing the participation of women in Czech politics.
 the Liberal Conservative Academy, a one-year interdisciplinary study program of economics, international relations, political science, political marketing, law, communications and public presentations. Graduates receive a Liberal Conservative Academy Diploma.

Democracy Assistance
CEVRO participates in programmes to support democracy abroad, including the transition of Egypt to democracy, and annual trips to Prague for democracy activists from countries such as Belarus, Cuba and Burma.

References

Civic Democratic Party (Czech Republic)
Think tanks based in the Czech Republic
1999 establishments in the Czech Republic